These are the full results of the 1992 IAAF World Cup which was held on 25, 26 and 27 September 1992 at the Estadio Panamericano in Havana, Cuba.

Results

100 m

200 m

400 m

800 m

1500 m

5000/3000 m

10,000 m

110/100 m hurdles

400 m hurdles

3000 m steeplechase

Men
26 September

4 × 100 m relay

4 × 400 m relay

High jump

Pole vault

Men
26 September

Long jump

Triple jump

Shot put

Discus throw

Hammer throw

Men
26 September

Javelin throw

References

Competition results
Full results
Full Results by IAAF (archived)

IAAF World Cup results
Events at the IAAF Continental Cups